This is a list of the National Register of Historic Places listings in Sullivan County, Pennsylvania.

This is intended to be a complete list of the properties and districts on National Register of Historic Places in Sullivan County, Pennsylvania. The locations of National Register properties and districts for which the latitude and longitude coordinates are included below, may be seen in a map.

There are 7 properties and districts listed on the National Register in the county.

Current listings

|}

See also

 List of Pennsylvania state historical markers in Sullivan County

References

 
Sullivan County